Geoffrey "Geoff" John Smith (born 6 March 1945) is a former Australian track and field athlete who competed in the decathlon.

A schoolteacher at Picnic Point High School in New South Wales, in January 1970 he broke the British, Commonwealth and Australian records when he won the New South Wales decathlon. He won the gold medal in the decathlon at the 1970 Commonwealth Games in Edinburgh.

References

External links 
 Geoffrey 'Geoff' Smith at Australian Athletics Historical Results

1945 births
Living people
Australian decathletes
Athletes (track and field) at the 1970 British Commonwealth Games
Commonwealth Games gold medallists for Australia
Commonwealth Games medallists in athletics
Medallists at the 1970 British Commonwealth Games